Ihor Shcherbakov (born 19 November 1955 in Dnipropetrovs’k) is a Ukrainian composer. He won a 1999 Shevchenko National Prize for  "Trap for a witch". Since 2010, he is President of the National Union of Composers of Ukraine.

He graduated from the P. I. Tchaikovsky National Music Academy of Ukraine. He teaches at the  Ukrainian National Academy of Music.

His Canzone for Two Violins was performed at the 2020 Ukrainian Contemporary Music Festival.

See also 
Premieres of the Season (Musical Festival)

References 

1955 births
Ukrainian composers
Recipients of the Shevchenko National Prize
Kyiv Conservatory alumni
Musicians from Dnipro
Living people
20th-century classical composers
21st-century classical composers
Ukrainian classical composers